An Young-gil (born 1 May 1980) is a South Korean professional Go player of 8-dan rank. As of 2011, An Young-gil was living in Australia promoting the game of Go. Co-founder of Go Game Guru, an open membership organization to promote Go to English-speaking students.

Promotion record

Titles and runners-up

References

External links
An Young-gil's articles at Go Game Guru
An Young-gil

1980 births
Living people
South Korean Go players